The 1934 All-Ireland Senior Football Championship Final was the 47th All-Ireland Final and the deciding match of the 1934 All-Ireland Senior Football Championship, an inter-county Gaelic football tournament for the top teams in Ireland.

Route to the final
Dublin easily defeated Kerry in the All-Ireland semi-final, held in 1934 in Tralee.

Match

Summary
A crowd of 36,143 attended the match. Galway had a two-point win over Dublin, with goals by the Kerry-born Michael Ferriter (2) and Martin Kelly.

The winning Galway team was the first to wear the now famous maroon and white colours of the county.

Bobby Beggs played for the losing Dublin team that day; he would line out for the winning Galway team in 1938.

This was Galway's second All-Ireland football title (the first was in 1925) and the first time the Sam Maguire Cup went west since it was first presented to the winning team in 1928.

Details

Post-match
The winning team went to New York to play some games for the Americans there.

A photograph exists showing the 1934 All-Ireland football title winning team aboard the ship on their way across the Atlantic to America. 

The captain was Mick Higgins. Also included are Mick Ferriter, Frank Fox, Dinny Sullivan, Tadg McCarthy, Fr Brune, masseur Toddy Ryan, County Board secretary Martin Regan, Mick Connaire, Brendan Nestor, Frank Burke, goalkeeper Michael Brennan, Joe Kelleher, Paddy Stephens, Ralph Griffin, John Dunne, Dermot Mitchell, Hugo Carey, Pat McDonnell, Tommy Hughes, trainer Tom Molloy, Fr Eugene McLoughlin, and various others whose identities are unknown.

References

All-Ireland Senior Football Championship Final
All-Ireland Senior Football Championship Final, 1934
All-Ireland Senior Football Championship Finals
Dublin county football team matches
Galway county football team matches